Nationality words link to articles with information on the nation's poetry or literature (for instance, Irish or France).

Events
 January 16 – English novelist and poet Thomas Hardy's ashes are interred in Poets' Corner of Westminster Abbey in London; pallbearers at the ceremony include Stanley Baldwin, J. M. Barrie, John Galsworthy, Edmund Gosse, A. E. Housman, Rudyard Kipling, Ramsay MacDonald and George Bernard Shaw. At the same time, Hardy's heart is interred where he wished to be buried, in the grave of his first wife, Emma, in the churchyard of his parish of birth, Stinsford ("Mellstock") in Dorset. Later in the year, his widow Florence publishes the first part of a biography, The Early Life of Thomas Hardy, 1840–1891 (Macmillan), in fact largely dictated by Hardy.
 September 21 – The Gorseth Kernow is set up at Boscawen-Un in Cornwall by Henry Jenner ("Gwas Myghal") and others.
 November 6 – Xu Zhimo writes his poem 再別康橋 (simplified Chinese 再别康桥, Zài Bié Kāngqiáo, "On Leaving Cambridge Once More").
 Russian poets Daniil Kharms and Alexander Vvedensky found OBERIU (a Russian acronym for "An Association of Real Art"), an avant-garde grouping of Russian post-Futurist poets in the 1920s-1930s
 American poets Charles Reznikoff, George Oppen and Louis Zukofsky meet in New York City; they will become some of the founders of the Objectivist poets group.
 The clerihew, the comic pseudo-biographical verse form associated with Edmund Clerihew Bentley, is mentioned in print for the first time.

Works published in English

Canada
Dorothy Livesay, Green Pitcher. Toronto: Macmillan.
Seranus, Later Poems and New Villanelles (Toronto: Ryerson).
 Arthur Stringer, A Woman At Dusk and Other Poems. Indianapolis: Bobbs-Merrill.

India, in English
 V. N. Bhusan, Silhouettes, Masulpatam: Youth of Asia Society; India, Indian poetry in English
 Joseph Furtado, A Goan Fiddler
 Shyam Sunder Lal Chordia, Chitor and Other Poems, Bombay: D. B. Taraporevala Sons and Co.

United Kingdom
 Rupert Brooke, Collected Poems, see also 1946
 Roy Campbell, The Wayzgoose, a lampoon, in rhyming couplets, on the cultural shortcomings of South Africa; South African native published in the United Kingdom, and at this time living there
 W. H. Davies, Collected Poems
 T. S. Eliot:
 "Perch' Io non Spero" (later to become part I of Ash Wednesday, published in 1930) was published in the Spring, 1928 issue of Commerce along with a French translation.
 A Song for Simeon printed in September by Faber & Gwyer as part of its Ariel poems series.
 H. S. Milford, editor, The Oxford Book of English Verse of the Romantic Period, 1798–1837: 1798–1837, Clarendon Press, anthology
 Thomas Hardy, Winter Words in Various Moods and Metres, (posthumous)
 D. H. Lawrence, Collected Poems
 John Masefield, Midsummer Night, and Other Tales in Verse
 Laura Riding, Love as Love, Death as Death
 Siegfried Sassoon, The Heart's Journey
 A. J. A. Symons, An Anthology of 'Nineties' Verse
 Humbert Wolfe:
 The Silver Cat, and Other Poems
 This Blind Rose
 W.B. Yeats, Irish poet published in the United Kingdom):
 The Tower, including "Sailing to Byzantium" and "Leda and the Swan", Irish
 The Death of Synge, and Other Passages from an Old Diary (poetry)

United States
 W. H. Auden, Poems
 Stephen Vincent Benét, John Brown's Body
 E. E. Cummings, Christmas Tree
 John Gould Fletcher, The Black Rock
 Robert Frost, West-Running Brook
 Robert Hillyer, The Seventh Hill
 Robinson Jeffers, Cawdor and Other Poems
 William Ellery Leonard, A Son of Earth
 Archibald MacLeish, The Hamlet of A. MacLeish
 Edgar Lee Masters, Jack Kelso: A Dramatic Poem
 Joseph Moncure March, "The Wild Party"
 Edna St. Vincent Millay, The Buck in the Snow
 Dorothy Parker, Sunset Gun
 Ezra Pound:
 Selected Poems, edited by T. S. Eliot, London, American poet living in Europe
 A Draft of the Cantos 17–27
 Edward Arlington Robinson, Sonnets, 1889–1927
 Carl Sandburg, Good Morning, America
 Allen Tate, Mr. Pope and Other Poems, including "Ode to the Confederate Dead"
 Amos Wilder, Arachne: poems, Yale University Press
 Elinor Wylie, Trivial Breath
 Louis Zukofsky completes the original versions of "A" 1, 2, 3 and 4, which have been compared to Pound's Cantos; the fragmentary long poem will be a lifelong project

Other in English
 John Le Gay Brereton, Swags Up, Australia
 Roy Campbell, The Wayzgoose: A South African Satire, South Africa
 W.B. Yeats, Irish poet published in the United Kingdom:
 The Tower, including "Sailing to Byzantium" and "Leda and the Swan", Irish
 The Death of Synge, and Other Passages from an Old Diary (poetry)

Works published in other languages

France
 René Char, Les Cloches sur le coeur
 Léon-Paul Fargue:
 Banalité
 Vulturne
 Francis Jammes, Diane
 Pierre Jean Jouve, Les Noces
 Alphonse Métérié, Nocturnes
 Benjamin Péret, Le grand jeu
 Pierre Reverdy, La Balle au bond
 Tristan Tzara, pen name of Sami Rosenstock, Indicateur des chemins de coeur

Indian subcontinent
Including all of the British colonies that later became India, Pakistan, Bangladesh, Sri Lanka and Nepal. Listed alphabetically by first name, regardless of surname:
 Cherian Mappila, also known as "Cheriyan Mappila", Shri Yesu Vijayam (also spelled "Sriyesuvijayam"), long poem about the life of Jesus, India, Malayalam language; a poem on a Christian theme; called the first major contribution to Indian literature by a Christian poet
 Nalini Bala Devi, Sandhiyar Sur, Assamese
 Peer Ghulam Mohammad Hanafi, Bagh-O Bahar, tales in verse in the Kashmiri language, derived from Urdu tales
 Sri Sri, Prabhava, Telugu
 Vakil Ghulam Ahmad Shah Qureshi, Pani Gulzar, Kashmiri

Spanish language

Spain
 Vicente Aleixandre, Ambito ("Milieu"), the author's first book of poems
 Federico García Lorca, Primer romancero gitano ("Gypsy Ballads")
 Jorge Guillén, Cántico, first edition, with 75 poems in five sections (enlarged edition, with 125 poems, 1936)

Other in Spanish
 Martín Adan, La case de cartón, a novel in verse, Peru
 Nellie Campobello, Yo, Mexico
 José Varallanos, El hombre del Ande que asesinó su esperanza, Peru

Other languages
 Nérée Beauchemin, Patrie intime, French language, Canada
 Uri Zvi Greenberg, Hazon Ehad Ha-Legionot ("A Vision of One of the Legions"), Hebrew language, Mandatory Palestine
 Aaro Hellaakoski, Jääpeili, Finland
 Stefan George, Das neue Reich ("The New Reich"), Germany
 Federico García Lorca, Romancero gitano ("Gypsy Ballads"), Spain
 Eugenio Montale, Ossi di seppia ("Cuttlefish Bones"), second edition, with six new poems and an introduction by Alfredo Gargiulo (first published in 1925; third edition, 1931), Lanciano: Carabba, Italy
 Takahashi Shinkichi, Takahashi Shinkichi shishu ("Poetical Works by Takahashi Shinkichi"), Tokyo: Nanso Shoin, Japan (Surname: Takahashi)
 J. Slauerhoff, Eldorado, Dutch

Awards and honors
 Pulitzer Prize for Poetry: Edwin Arlington Robinson wins his third Pulitzer Prize for Poetry this decade, this time for Tristram

Births
Death years link to the corresponding "[year] in poetry" article:
 January 1 – Iain Crichton Smith (died 1998), Scottish poet and fiction writer in both English and Scottish Gaelic
 January 8 – Gaston Miron (died 1996), Canadian poet and author
 January 10 – Philip Levine (died 2015), American poet, educator and winner of the Pulitzer Prize for Poetry
 January 29 – Gene Frumkin (died 2007), American poet
 February 2 – Cynthia Macdonald (died 2015, American poet
 February 14 – Bruce Beaver (died 2004), Australian poet
 February 25 – Hushang Ebtehaj (H. E. Sayeh) (died 2022), Persian poet
 March 1 – Conrad Hilberry (died 2017), American poet
 March 4 – Alan Sillitoe (died 2010), English poet and writer, one of the "Angry Young Men" of the 1950s
 March 13 – Bob Brissenden (died 1991), Australian poet
 March 18 – Dave Etter (died 2015), American poet
 March 28 – Vayalar Rama Varma (died 1975), Indian, Malayalam-language poet and film songwriter
 April 4 – Maya Angelou (died 2014), African-American poet
 April 7 – Gael Turnbull (died 2004), Scottish poet
 April 26 – Hertha Kräftner (died 1951), Austrian poet
 May 4 – Thomas Kinsella (died 2021), Irish poet, translator, editor and publisher
 May 11 – Luo Fu (or Lo Fu, pen name of Mo Luofu; died 2018), Chinese-language Taiwanese poet, writer and translator
 June 24 – ruth weiss (died 2020), German-born American poet of the beat generation
 June 27 – Peter Davison (died 2004), American poet, essayist, teacher, lecturer, editor and publisher
 July 4 – Ted Joans (died 2003) African-American trumpeter, jazz poet and painter
 September 20
 Alberto de Lacerda (died 2007), Mozambique-born Portuguese poet
 Donald Hall (died 2018), American poet and U.S. Poet Laureate
 September 22
 Irving Feldman, American poet and educator
 Édouard Glissant (died 2011), French-Martiniquan poet and writer.
 October 17 – Rosemary Tonks (died 2014), English poet and novelist
 October 28 – Yu Guangzhong (余光中) (died 2017), Chinese writer, poet, educator and critic
 November 9 – Anne Sexton (died 1974), American poet and winner of the Pulitzer Prize for Poetry in 1967
 December 3 – Karin Bang (died 2017), Norwegian novelist and poet
 December 10 – Milan Rufus (died 2009), Slovak poet and academic
 December 15 – William Dickey (died 1994), American poet
 December 23 – Anthony Cronin (died 2016), Irish poet
 Also:
 Carol Bergé (died 2006), American poet
 Rasa Chughtai (died 2018), Indian-born Pakistani poet

Deaths

Death years link to the corresponding "[year] in poetry" article:
 January 11 – Thomas Hardy (born 1840), English novelist and poet
 February 5 – David McKee Wright (born 1869), Irish-born poet and journalist, active in New Zealand and Australia
 February 19 – Ina Coolbrith (born 1841), American poet, writer and librarian
 March 18 – Paul van Ostaijen (born 1896), Belgian poet
 March 24 – Charlotte Mew (born 1869), English poet, from suicide
 May 16 – Edmund Gosse (born 1849), English poet and critic
 July 20 – Kostas Karyotakis (born 1896), Greek poet
 August 16 – Antonín Sova (born 1864), Czech poet and librarian
 September 17 – Bokusui Wakayama, 若山 牧水 (born 1885), Japanese "Naturalist" tanka poet
 December 16 – Elinor Wylie (born 1885), American poet and novelist

See also

 Poetry
 List of years in poetry
 New Objectivity in German literature and art
 Oberiu movement in Russian art and poetry

Notes

20th-century poetry
Poetry